"Mowgli's Road" is a song by Welsh singer Marina and the Diamonds from her debut studio album, The Family Jewels (2010). The song's demo was released as a double A-side single with "Obsessions", on 16 February 2009 by Neon Gold Records. On 13 November 2009, "Mowgli's Road" was released digitally again as a double A-side, pairing with a cover of the Late of the Pier song "Space and the Woods".

The title is a reference to the character of the same name in Rudyard Kipling's The Jungle Book story collection. It has been described to be a pop, alternative pop, and experimental pop song.

Critical reception
Stuart Heritage of The Guardian wrote, "'Mowgli's Road' is odd. Think Gary Glitter, but if he kept pictures of The Wicker Man and some nice cutlery on his hard drive instead of that other stuff. This could easily be a hit; or, rather, the first couple of minutes could. Then it descends into a lunatic mixture of monkey wails, whistling and childlike nightmare mumbles that may well be responsible for my chronic insomnia."

Music video
The music video for "Mowgli's Road" was directed by Chris Sweeney and released onto YouTube on 20 October 2009. The video features Diamandis and two girls with origami limbs and torso dancing in a spotlight with a white screen. In the second verse, Diamandis sings into a microphone on a stand. It begins with Diamandis standing without lighting and stomping her origami legs to the beat of the music. When the lighting comes on, Diamandis begins singing and moving her origami legs; two female dancers with the same legs appear and dance with her. After the repeat of the chorus, Diamandis is shown with her origami torso, bouncing up and down while singing the third verse. While the music continues in the song, Diamandis and the dancers dance with all limbs in origami form. The video ends with the lighting of the set going out and they all stand as Diamandis was in the beginning.

Track listings
Digital single

 Digital remixes

 UK limited-edition 7-inch single

Credits and personnel 
Credits adapted from the liner notes of The Family Jewels.

Recording and management
 Recorded at The Ivory Tower and Konk Studios (London, England)
 Mixed at The Ivory Tower
 Mastered at Electric Mastering (London, England)
 Published by Warner Chappell Music Publishing Ltd/Sony/ATV

Personnel
 Marina Diamandis – vocals
 Liam Howe – production, engineering, programming, drums, spoons, Philicorda, whistle, glockenspiel, bass, acoustic guitar, mixing
 Dougal Lott – Pro Tools
 Alex Mackenzie – harpsichord, drums
 Raymond67 (Freesound Project) – mechanical monkey
 Sandyrb (Freesound Project) – human monkey
 Guy Davie – mastering

References

2009 singles
2009 songs
679 Artists singles
Marina Diamandis songs
Songs written by Liam Howe
Songs written by Marina Diamandis